The London Canoe Slalom Invitational was an international Canoe Slalom event held at the Lee Valley White Water Centre between July 28 and 31 2011. The Regatta was closed to the media and public. It was a 2012 Olympics test event and was part of the London Prepares series

Results

References

Canoe Slalom Invitational
Canoeing and kayaking competitions in the United Kingdom
2011 in canoeing
Canoeing in England
2011 in English sport